Kurșunlu, formerly Karacaviran, is a town in Çankırı Province in the Central Anatolia region of Turkey. It is the seat of Kurşunlu District. Its population is 4,908 (2021). The town consists of 12 quarters: Beşpınar, Cömertler, Çal, Hacıbekir, Kalekapı, Yeni, Yeşil, Erenler, Kale, Müslüm, Çavundur and Çiyni. It was affected by the Kurșunlu earthquake in 1951.

References

External links
 Municipality's official website 

Populated places in Kurşunlu District
Towns in Turkey
Paphlagonia